Tafsir Zia ul Quran is a Quranic exegesis (tafsir) written by Muhammad Karam Shah al-Azhari (1918–1998). He was a Sunni scholar specialized in the Hanafi fiqh. He also belonged to the Chishti Sufi order. The tafsir has been published in 5 volumes.

Title 
Mostly the names of Islamic texts are kept in Arabic, even if the text is in a non Arabic language. Following this de facto rule, Muhammad Karam Shah al-Azhari named his book, which is also considered as his magnum opus as Diya ul Quran fi Tafsir ul Quran meaning “The light of the Quran in the Exegesis of the Quran”, commonly referred to as Diya ul Quran or Zia ul Quran.

Specialty 
This book won the hearts of the scholars as well as the masses for its simple yet complete tone making it easy to understand for the public. In this tafsir he heavily quoted the Quran itself as well as the authentic Ahadith. He also mentioned the lexigraphic, morphologic and the grammatical points whilst also quoting relevant historical narratives pertaining to asbab al-nuzul.

Compilation 
This book was compiled in the author's life. It was later recompiled and published in five volumes by a newly founded publishing house name after the tafsir—The Zia Ul Quran Publishers.

See also
Zia un Nabi (1995) (a detailed biography of prophet Muhammad in seven volumes)

References

External links
Quran Tafseer

Quranic exegesis
Quran translations
Barelvi literature
Zia ul Quran
Zia ul Quran